Togba was a town in southern central Mauritania. Its ruins were discovered in archeological investigations seeking the site of Aoudaghost, which is nearby.

References

Archaeological sites in Mauritania
Archaeological sites of Western Africa